Thomas Gunst (born July 26, 1959 in Bad Dürkheim) is a former field hockey player from West Germany, who was a member of the West German team that won the silver medal at the 1984 Summer Olympics in Los Angeles, California.

References
 Profile

External links
 

1959 births
Living people
People from Bad Dürkheim
Sportspeople from Rhineland-Palatinate
German male field hockey players
Olympic field hockey players of West Germany
Olympic silver medalists for West Germany
Field hockey players at the 1984 Summer Olympics
Olympic medalists in field hockey
Medalists at the 1984 Summer Olympics